Little Chocolatiers is an American reality television series that aired on TLC. The show is based on Steve Hatch and his wife Katie Masterson's chocolate shop and how they make their chocolate. Each episode showed their orders in-the-making. TLC premiered the show with an hour-long special on December 21, 2009. The regular series debuted on January 31, 2010. The show was put on hold indefinitely in May 2010.

Episodes

Specials (2009)

Season 1 (2010)

References

External links
 

2009 American television series debuts
2010 American television series endings
Food reality television series
TLC (TV network) original programming
Television shows set in Utah